Ningalenne Communistakki is a 1970 Indian Malayalam-language film written and directed by Thoppil Bhasi and produced by Kunchacko. It is based on the play of the same name. The film stars Sathyanmash , [[Prem Nazeer

(actor)|Sathyan]], Sheela and Jayabharathi in the lead roles. The film had musical score by G. Devarajan. The film was huge hit.

Plot 
Paramu Pillai (Sathyan) is a farmer struggling to make ends meet. He lives in a small village with his wife Kalyani (Vijaya Kumari), son Gopalan (Prem Nazir) and daughter Meenakshi (KPAC Lalitha). Gopalan discontinues his college studies and works for the welfare of agricultural laborer's and small-time farmers. Mathew (K. P. Ummer) is another leader of the agricultural workers union who supports Gopalan in his activities.

Valiyaveetil Kesavan Nair (Kottayam Chellanppan) is the local landlord. He is cruel and makes his workers toil like slaves. Gopalan becomes Kesavan Nair's sworn enemy. Kesavan Nair's daughter Sumavalli (Sheela) is in love with Gopalan.

Kesavan Nair succeeds in taking possession of the holdings of some of the poor farmers in the village. His eye now falls on Paramu Pillai's land. His evil eye also falls on Mala (Jayabharathi), daughter of Karamban (Thoppil Krishna Pillai), a small time farmer. Gopalan saves Mala from Nair. Mala takes a liking for Gopalan but withdraws in favour of Sumavalli.

Nair's wicked plans and his anti-labourer attitude are exposed by Gopalan and his followers. Nair decides to take revenge. Gopalan is beaten up and is hospitalised.

Nair succeeds in taking possession of Paramu Pillai's and Karamban's land by using forged title deeds. Paramu Pillai who was always against the policies of his son and his party realises his ignorance. He joins the party procession that moves through the village, holding the Red Flag afloat. The wicked ways, the anti-worker policies of the wealthy turns Paramu Pillai into a Communist

Cast 

Sathyan as Paramu Pilla, a struggling peasant 
Prem Nazir as Gopalan, son of Paramu Pilla
Sheela as Sumavalli
Jayabharathi as Mala
Kottayam Chellappan as Valiyaveetil Kesavan Nair, Rich landlord 
KPAC Lalitha as Meenakshi, daughter of Paramu Pilla
K. P. Ummer as Mathew, leader of the workers union who supports Gopalan
Thoppil Krishna Pillai as Karamban
Vijaya Kumari as Kalyani
Alummoodan as Velu

Production 
Most of the plays staged by Kerala Peoples Arts Club, popularly known as KPAC, also became successful in film. Ningalenne Communistakki  is based on the play of the same name, which was first staged in 1952.

Soundtrack

References

External links 
 

1970 films
1970s Malayalam-language films
Indian films based on plays
Films directed by Thoppil Bhasi